

References

Human protein-coding genes 2